Park Min-gyu (born 10 August 1995) is a South Korean footballer currently playing as a defender for Gimcheon Sangmu.

Club career 
Park Min-gyu joined FC Seoul in 2017.

On 11 April 2017, Pak Min-gyu debuted in AFC Champions League (vs Western Sydney Wanderers)

Career statistics

Club
As of 4 March 2023

Notes

Honours

References

External links
 

1995 births
Living people
South Korean footballers
Association football defenders
K League 1 players
K League 2 players
FC Seoul players
Daejeon Hana Citizen FC players
Suwon FC players
Busan IPark players